Sunnymead is a suburb in the northern part of Oxford, England, just south of the Oxford Ring Road (A40).
Close by are the suburbs of Cutteslowe to the north, Summertown to the south and Upper Wolvercote to the west. To the east is the River Cherwell, which flows south towards central Oxford.

See also
 North Oxford

Areas of Oxford